Care is a single British television crime drama film, written by former Tomorrow's World presenter Kieran Prendiville, that first broadcast on BBC1 on 8 October 2000. Directed by Antonia Bird, Care follows Davey Younger (Steven Mackintosh), a former childhood resident of Glenavon care home, who is forced to dig up his past when a local councillor, Tony Collins (Richard Harrington), orders an investigation into reported historical sex abuse, which took place at the home during Davey's years as a resident, following evidence unearthed by journalist Elaine Hughes (Jaye Griffiths).

Broadcast
Although described by Prendville as an entirely fictional piece, Care, which Prendiville spent two and a half years researching, was somewhat based upon a real life case uncovered during the North Wales child abuse scandal. The home itself was said to be based upon Bryn Estyn, and the character of Davey based upon one of the most infamous victims of the scandal, Mark Humphrys.

Immediately following the film's broadcast, a live panel debate, entitled Forgotten Children, was broadcast, chaired by Huw Edwards and featuring panellists including Allan Levy QC and Valerie Howarth, the then-chief executive of Childline. The debate discussed issues raised by the programme and examined why several such scandals have gone unearthed for so long. The film went on to win several awards, including the Cologne International Film Festival Gold for Best Single Drama, a BAFTA award for Best Single Drama, BAFTA Cymru and RTS Television Awards for Best Actor (Mackintosh), and the Prix Italia in Bologna in 2001.

The film was re-broadcast on BBC Four on 22 May 2016, just six months before former police superintendent Gordon Anglesea, whom one of the film's characters is said to be based upon, was sentenced to twelve years in prison for the sexual abuse of a 14 and 15-year-old boy, with one of the victims being a resident of the Bryn Estyn care home, having previously been found innocent of all charges by the High Court and having successfully sued four media organisations for libel in 1994, winning £375,000.

The film attracted a viewing audience of around 4 million, but notably sparked over 6,000 phone calls to police forces across the country to report undiscovered historical sex abuse across care homes across the United Kingdom.

Reception
Cultural historian Richard Webster criticised the piece, claiming that it was "the latest attempt to disseminate a mythical account of events", and describing it as "ill-conceived and misleading". However, Webster's allegation that the abuse at Bryn Estyn was a fabrication motivated by the desire for financial compensation was undermined by a further Police investigation in which further witnesses came forward in the knowledge no further compensation was available.

Cast
 Steven Mackintosh as Davey Younger
 Jaye Griffiths as Elaine Hughes
 Maria Pride as Pauline
 Charlotte Cornwell as Joanne Hallows
 Peter Wight as Francis Chambers
 Aneirin Hughes as Tom Ferguson
 Clive Merrison as Desmond Pickering
 Richard Harrington as Tony Collins
 Rhys Parry Jones as Donald Bainbridge
 Daniel Parker	as Young Davey
 Geraint Thomas as John
 Kit Jackson as Ian Chalmers
 Morgan Hopkins as Kite
 Lynn Hunter as Angela
 Huw Davies as DC Price
 William Ivory as DS Devlin
 Dorien Thomas as DC Lorimer

References

External links
 

BBC television dramas
2000 British television series debuts
2000 British television series endings
2000s British drama television series
English-language television shows